American Pimp is a 1999 documentary that examines the pimp subculture in the United States. It was directed by the Hughes Brothers, the filmmakers behind Menace II Society and Dead Presidents. 
 
The documentary consists of first person interviews of people involved in the pimping lifestyle ("the game"). The interviews are separated by short clips from 1970s blaxploitation films such as Willie Dynamite, The Mack, and Dolemite.

The first portion of the documentary focuses on pimps working illegally.  The illegal pimps that are interviewed are from all over the United States, e.g., Charm from Hawaii, Fillmore Slim from San Francisco, and Payroll from Las Vegas.  These pimps, and many others discuss their theories on the history of prostitution. The pimps go on to talk about their philosophy on pimping, and how they live their daily life.

The film also discusses the legal sector of prostitution. Dennis Hof, the owner of the Bunny Ranch in Nevada, is interviewed. He feels that Nevada is much smarter than the other states because they have imposed the proper health and background checks on prostitution, instead of trying to suppress prostitution by making it illegal.

The majority of the documentary glorifies the pimping lifestyle. The pimps and prostitutes interviewed mainly discuss the perks of the lifestyle. They talk about the money they have made, and the expensive suits and cars they were able to buy. However, near the end of the film, the interviews involve prostitutes that have died from the lifestyle as well as pimps who have retired and hold straight jobs or those who are now in jail.

Interviews
Rosebudd (real name: John S. Dickson)
Fillmore Slim (real name: Clarence Sims)
Gorgeous Dre (real name: Andre Taylor)
Mel Taylor
Danny Brown
Ken Red (real name: Louis Kenneth Wright)
Payroll
Schauntté Parker
Charm
Latrice
Jade
Sir Captain
Bradley
Payroll (Lorence Hammond)
Too Short
Mr. Ivy (also known as Pimpin' Ken)
Bishop Don Magic Juan
R.P.
Dennis Hof
C-Note
Caleb Devine (real name: Caleb Benn)

TV adaptation
The Hughes brothers planned to re-explore the themes of American Pimp in a 2009 HBO drama series called Gentlemen of Leisure. Gentlemen of Leisure was to examine the world of prostitution in Oakland, California, focusing on a 35-year-old legendary pimp and his attempts to get out of the business. However, before filming began, the show came under fire from the then Oakland Mayor Ron Dellums and other city officials who were worried about the impact that Gentlemen of Leisure would have had on Oakland's image.

Dellums' Chief of Staff, David Chai, said, "It is the mayor's view that this project goes against our vision of Oakland as a 'model city' and does a disservice to residents and visitors alike", and "while the mayor understands that there are certain benefits to having a major film project in our city, he is not willing to support this project at this time. The people of Oakland have come too far to have our city's name trampled upon in the name of entertainment."

See also
Pimps Up, Ho's Down

References

External links

American Pimp at MGM Movie Database
Sfgate:"Pimps Strut in Documentary/Hookers they exploit get less say" by Edward Guthmann; June 16, 2000

1999 films
1999 documentary films
American documentary films
Documentary films about prostitution in the United States
1990s English-language films
Films directed by the Hughes brothers
1990s American films